Spyros Thodis (born 23 July 1955) is a Greek former professional footballer who played as midfielder.

Club career
Thodis started playing at Anagennisi Karditsa in 1971 at the age of 16 in the second division. He played in the position of central midfielder, responding to the demands of the position despite his young age, as he possessed a remarkable technical training that allowed him to organize the team's game and with his infallible passes to direct its development. His eight-year presence in the second division with Anagennisi Karditsa until 1979, put him in the sights of several big teams and he was the alternative solution of AEK Athens, if the move to the club of the then midfielder of Pierikos, Lakis Papaioannou was not completed. Some problems that broke down the negotiations of the agents of AEK with the people of Pierikos, sent Papaioannou to Iraklis and in the summer of 1979 brought Thodis to AEK.

His style of play and the display of leadership skills on the field caused the admiration of the fans and led the collective press of the era, to add a letter to the player's last name and changing it to "Theodis" (paraphrase of his first name to resemble the Greek word for God). The expectations of fans, journalists and more of Thodis himself were not verified to the extent required by the value of the footballer, as his occasional coexistence in the team with other midfielders such as Franjo Vladić, Hristo Bonev and Kostas Eleftherakis, in a strange way, led the coaches of the "yellow-blacks" to assign him in more defensive duties of the midfield area than offensive. Wanting to always remain consistent in the duties assigned to him, he tried to cover the position of the defensive midfielder, without creating problems to the team, despite the fact that he stayed away from his natural area of ​​play. With AEK, he won the Greek Cup in 1983, but without having an active participation as that season he had only 1 participation in its matches, a consequence of the injuries to the leg but mainly to the waist which troubled him a lot during his career. In the summer of 1984, he returned to "officially" hang up his football boots in the Anagennisi Karditsa team, despite the fact that, as a fanatic football fan that he was, he continued to play in smaller amateur clubs until 1999.

After football
Thodis is professionally active in the area of ​​his birthplace, Karditsa, enacting with catering businesses and cafeterias.

Honours

AEK Athens 
Greek Cup: 1982–83

References

1955 births
Living people
Greek footballers
Super League Greece players
Anagennisi Karditsa F.C. players
AEK Athens F.C. players
Association football midfielders
Footballers from Karditsa